The Frasers of Philorth are a Scottish lowland family, originally from the Anjou region of France. Castle Fraser, their family seat, is in Sauchen, Aberdeenshire, Scotland.  Since the time of Alexander Fraser, 11th Lord Saltoun, the heads of the Philorth family are the Lords Saltoun. The current head of the Frasers of Philorth is Flora Fraser, 21st Lady Saltoun, who is Chief of the Name and Arms of Clan Fraser since 1 May 1984, by decree of the Court of the Lord Lyon. The family's arms are "azure, three cinquefoils argent"—three silver strawberry flowers on a field of blue. The heraldic cinquefoil is a stylized five-point leaf; the cinquefoils which appear on the Fraser of Philorth coat-of-arms are specifically strawberry flowers. Only the Lady or Lord Saltoun is permitted to display these arms plain and undifferenced.

History
Fraserburgh Alexander's grandson, also Alexander, married a daughter of the Earl of Ross, acquiring the lands of Philorth in Buchan, plus the castle of Cairnbulg, which has been the seat of the Fraser chiefs from that time forward.

In 1504, the family purchased a fishing community called Faithlie, by Kinnaird Head. On coming into possession in 1569, Sir Alexander, 8th Lord of Philorth, began to build "a large and beautiful town". He laid the foundation of the Tower of Kynnairdshead, since called the Castle of Fraserburgh, and built a church.

They created a burgh of barony in 1546.

In 1592, Alexander was given a charter by James VI for Faithlie. He improved the harbour, making the area a thriving town, which soon became a free port and burgh called Fraserburgh, a rival of Aberdeen.

Around 1596, the family built Pittulie Castle.

Fraserburgh was to have had a university, but the religious troubles and competition from Aberdeen stemmed the town’s growth. By building Fraserburgh Castle the Laird bankrupted himself, and had to sell the Philorth Castle, which passed out of the family for over 300 years until Alexander Fraser, 19th Lord Saltoun, bought it back in 1934. Alexander, 9th Lord of Philorth, married the heiress of the Lord Saltoun, a title borne by the Clan Fraser chiefs since that time.

The Chiefship was in dispute between the Frasers of Philorth and another branch, which also came from Tweeddale, the Frasers of Muchalls. In the reign of Charles I. The peerage expired with the fourth Lord Fraser, who died in 1716 while on the run as a result of his participation in The Fifteen. The first two sons of Andrew, the 2nd Lord Fraser, were not seen in Scotland after the 1650 Battle of Dunbar. One of them, James Fraser, ended up in Massachusetts (USA) as "James Frizzell." He lived in Roxbury, MA; married in 1656; had children; and died in 1717.

References

External links
Frasers of Philorth from Baronage Press

Philorth, Frasers of
Fraser of Philorth
Fraserburgh
Scottish Lowlands